The Puno antpitta (Grallaria sinaensis) is a species of bird in the family Grallariidae. It is a member of the rufous antpitta species complex and was first described by Mark B. Robbins, Morton L. Isler, R. Terry Chesser and Joseph Tobias in 2020. It is found in the Peruvian department of Puno and the Bolivian department of La Paz.

Taxonomy 
The Puno antpitta was described as a new species in the rufous antpitta complex in 2020 based on differences in plumage and vocalizations.

The specific name, sinaensis, is named for the antpitta's type locality: Sina, Puno, Peru. The common name is named for the Peruvian department that the type location is in: Puno.

Distribution and habitat 
The Puno antpitta has a very restricted range in Puno, Peru and La Paz, Bolivia. It is found at elevations of 2,900–3,150 m. Its preferred habitat is humid montane forest and it prefers the understory and forest floor.

It is protected in part of its range by the Madidi National Park.

References 

Birds of Peru
Birds of Bolivia
Grallaria